Reg Mulavin (8 September 1912 – 13 March 1989) was an Australian rules footballer who played with Hawthorn in the Victorian Football League (VFL).

Notes

External links 

1912 births
1989 deaths
Australian rules footballers from Victoria (Australia)
Hawthorn Football Club players